Ronald Fisher (28 February 1880 – 26 March 1959) was a New Zealand cricketer. He played in three first-class matches for Canterbury from 1904 to 1906.

See also
 List of Canterbury representative cricketers

References

External links
 

1880 births
1959 deaths
New Zealand cricketers
Canterbury cricketers
Cricketers from Christchurch